Joe Exter (born December 19, 1978) is a retired American ice hockey goaltender. He is famous for playing two seasons with the ECHL's Wheeling Nailers several months after being in a coma due to an on-ice collision.

Career
Exter started his career with the Erie Otters, where he split time with former Edmonton Oilers draft pick Patrick Dovigi and former Los Angeles Kings draft pick Steve Valiquette. He played eleven games, going 0-4-0 with a 4.13 GAA. After a year with the Waterloo Black Hawks of the USHL where he shared duties with two other goalies, Exter moved on to Merrimack College of Hockey East. Exter started more than twenty-five games in each of his three seasons with Merrimack College, compiling a 31-47-8 record.

Coma
On March 8, 2003, Exter and Boston College forward Patrick Eaves were racing for an open puck with about six minutes left in the game.  Exter and Eaves collided, with Eaves' left hip striking Exter in the head. The resulting hit knocked Exter's helmet from his head. As Exter's head hit the ice, he was knocked unconscious and blood began to pour from both of his ears. Paramedics on standby for the game and trainers from both Merrimack and Boston college treated Exter and immobilized him before removing him from the ice and transporting him to Beth Israel Deaconess Medical Center. Upon admission, Exter was in a critical condition and was put in a medically induced coma for ten days, and doctors suggested that he retire from hockey. After ten days, Exter was taken off sedatives and started to acknowledge questions by a series of blinks. In less than three weeks, Exter was moved to Spaulding Rehabilitation Center, where he re-learned to speak and to swallow. A week later, Exter was released to his Cranston home. Exter would later say that he did not blame Eaves for the hit, and that the incident was "a hockey play."

Exter completed a series of rehabilitation tests within a week of therapy and decided that he was still could play hockey. By August, he was training on Merrimack's ice. Despite the numerous weeks of training and therapy, Exter received minimal interest from scouts. He would receive an offer from Pittsburgh Penguins scout Greg Malone, who had been scouting Exter prior to his accident. Exter eventually signed with the Wilkes-Barre/Scranton Penguins, the Penguins' AHL affiliate, on December 24, 2003, and was immediately assigned to the Penguins' ECHL affiliate in Wheeling.

Professional
In his rookie season, Exter went 8-2-0 in 15 games and led the team with a .924 save percentage. Since Exter played more than ten games in his rookie season, this activated a clause in his contract that required the Wilkes-Barre/Scranton Penguins to re-sign Exter for the following season.

During the 2004-05 season (which coincided with the NHL lockout), Exter shared goaltending duties with Pittsburgh Penguins draft picks Dany Sabourin and Andy Chiodo. Coincidentally, Ben Eaves, brother of Patrick Eaves and also a Penguins draft pick, was also a member of the 2004-05 Nailers. Exter finished the season 10-13-2 with a career-high four shutouts.

Retirement
Upon his retirement, Exter became involved in coaching. He started as an assistant coach with American International College during the 2005-06 season. Since 2008, Exter has been involved with both the US U18 and U20 programs, being named the first full-time goaltender coach in program history.

In addition to working with the USA Hockey's National Team Development Program, Exter is also an assistant coach with the Ohio State University ice hockey team, being named to the coaching staff on July 11,

Awards and honors

References

External links

1978 births
American men's ice hockey goaltenders
Erie Otters players
Living people
Merrimack Warriors men's ice hockey players
Sportspeople from Cranston, Rhode Island
Waterloo Black Hawks players
Wheeling Nailers players
Ice hockey players from Rhode Island